Italian Liberal Party may refer to:
Italian Liberal Party (1922–1994)
Italian Liberal Party (1997–present)